Mary Adams may refer to:

 Mary Adams (activist) (born 1938), tax activist who led the repeal of Maine's statewide property tax and efforts to enact a Taxpayer Bill of Rights
 Mary Adams (actress) (1910–1973), American actress
 Mary Adams (broadcaster) (1898–1984), administrator who helped to develop the BBC's television service in the 1950s
 Mary Adams (codebreaker) (1922–2010), Scottish interceptor for Bletchley Park during World War II
 Mary Adams (educator) (1823–1898), Canadian women's education reformer
 Mary Hellen Adams, (1806–1870), wife of John Adams II, daughter in-law of John Quincy Adams
 Mary Mathews Adams (1840–1902), Irish poet
 Mary Kay Adams (born 1962), American television actress
 Mary Kawennatakie Adams (1917–1999), First Nations basketmaker
 Mary Newbury Adams (1837–1901), American women's suffragist and education advocate
 A pseudonym for Communist Party USA activist Williana Burroughs (1882–1945), used in the 1920s

See also
Marie Adams (disambiguation)
Maria Adams (disambiguation)